Aurel Macarencu (born March 8, 1963) is a Romanian sprint canoer who competed from 1985 to 1988.

Career
Macarencu won five medals at the ICF Canoe Sprint World Championships with two golds (C-1 1000 m and C-1 10000 m: both 1986), one silver (C-1 500 m: 1986), and two bronzes (C-1 500 m and C-1 1000 m: both 1985).

Macarencu competed at the 1988 Summer Olympics in Seoul, finishing fifth in the C-1 1000 m and sixth in the C-1 500 m events.

References

1963 births
Canoeists at the 1988 Summer Olympics
Living people
Olympic canoeists of Romania
Romanian male canoeists
ICF Canoe Sprint World Championships medalists in Canadian